HDMS Helgoland was a coast defence barbette ironclad bult for the Royal Danish Navy in the late 1870s. The ship was decommissioned in 1907 and subsequently scrapped.

Design and description
She displaced  and was fitted with a ram bow. Her crew consisted of 350 officers and enlisted men.

The ship was fitted with a pair of Burmeister & Wain compound-expansion steam engines, each engine driving one propeller shaft using steam provided by eight cylindrical boilers.

The ironclad's main battery consisted of a single 22-caliber  rifled breech-loading (RBL) gun mounted in the barbette. She was also armed with four single 22-caliber  RBL guns in the corners of the armored citadel in the hull. For defense against torpedo boats, the ship was equipped with five 25-caliber  guns. She was also fitted with two  torpedo launchers.

The barbette and the side of the armored citadel were protected by 260 mm of armor.

Construction and service
Helgoland, named for the 1864 Danish victory over the combined Prussian and Austro-Hungarian squadron at Battle of Heligoland during the Second Schleswig War, was laid down on 20 May 1875 by the Orlogsværftet in Copenhagen, launched on 9 May 1878 and commissioned on 20 August 1879.

Notes

References
 
 
 

Ironclad warships of the Royal Danish Navy
1878 ships
Ships built in Copenhagen